Eupithecia yakushimensis is a moth in the family Geometridae. It is found in Japan.

References

Moths described in 1980
yakushimensis
Moths of Japan